Chen Chi-mai (born December 23, 1964) is a Taiwanese politician and the current Mayor of Kaoshiung since August 24, 2020. He has served as spokesperson of the Democratic Progressive Party and the chief executive officer of its Policy Research and Coordinating Committee. A physician from Keelung, Chen started his political career by becoming member of the Legislative Yuan in 1996 and served as legislator for almost eight years before becoming the spokesperson of the Executive Yuan.

In 2005, Chen succeeded to the mayoralty of Kaohsiung after Frank Hsieh's appointment as premier. Chen became the Deputy Secretary-General of the Presidential Office in 2007 and served until the inauguration of President Ma Ying-jeou. Following his December 2018 loss in the Kaohsiung mayoral election, Chen was appointed Vice Premier of the Republic of China by President Tsai Ing-wen. Chen yielded the vice premiership to Shen Jong-chin in June 2020, and won the Kaohsiung mayoralty in a by-election on August 15, 2020 after previous mayor Han Kuo-yu was recalled.

Early life 
Chen Chi-mai was born in Keelung City, Taiwan, on December 23, 1964. He is the son of Chen Che-nan, who is also a politician and was also a Deputy Secretary-General of the Presidential Office before Chen took office in 2007.

Chen studied medicine at the Chung Shan Medical University in Taichung, where he earned his MB degree in 1991. He got his MS degree in preventive medicine at the National Taiwan University in 1994. He practiced medicine at the Chang Gung Memorial Hospital for about three years and became a lecturer at the Taipei Medical University in 1996.

Chen made his early entry into public affairs when he, as a student, served as an assistant to his father, a legislator at the time.

Rise in politics 
A member of the Democratic Progressive Party (DPP), Chen was elected legislator three times serving from 1996 to 2004. During his term, he became the secretary-general of the Justice Alliance faction of the DPP in 1998 and the legislative caucus leader in 1999. He also became members of various committees within the Legislative Yuan, including the Foreign Affairs, Judiciary, National Defense, and Transportation Committees.

Before the DPP became the ruling party, Chen suggested that then-incumbent magistrate of Taoyuan County Annette Lu would be a better choice for Chen Shui-bian's presidential running mate than any other party member. Lu was eventually selected as his running mate.

After Shui-bian's successful presidential campaign, Chen Chi-mai, as a leader of the Justice Alliance faction, supported the proposal of another member to revise the pro-independence guideline. Although many party members had similar views, the proposal was sent back to the party's policy research department for review.

In 2004, Chen was appointed a Minister without Portfolio and spokesperson of the Executive Yuan. Soon after, another proposal to modify pro-independence guidelines was created. Several DPP legislators believed that the change of the national title from "Republic of China" to "Taiwan," which is one of the ultimate goals of Taiwan's desinicization campaign and localization movement, was not necessary. Chen also supported the proposal. The proposal was documented in an essay called New Culture Discourse, drafted by DPP legislator Lee Wen-chung of the New Tide faction. After the essay was leaked to the media, many politicians, including Chen, denied being involved in drafting the document. The document was proved too controversial and was attacked within the party as a result, although some members believed that it was only based on the 1999 Resolution on Taiwan's Future.

In January 2005, following the death of former CCP General Secretary Zhao Ziyang, Chen represented the Taiwanese cabinet in delivering a message to the Chinese government. In his address, Chen urged China's leaders to pursue democratization. Chen stated that Beijing should "face the truth about Tiananmen Square... We urge the Chinese government to learn from Mr. Zhao's tolerance and to push for democratic reforms."

Later in January 2005, Chen Chi-mai was nominated to serve as acting mayor of Kaohsiung by premier-designate Frank Hsieh.

Mayoralty 
After becoming the mayor of Kaohsiung, Chen sought to continue construction of the Kaohsiung Mass Rapid Transit (KMRT), a major construction started during Frank Hsieh's mayoral term. The Red Line of the system is opened, and the Orange Line was scheduled to be opened in August 2008.

Chen also worked to turn Kaohsiung into the a film location hub by encouraging filmmakers to shoot their films in the port city. He offered filmmakers, such as Tsai Ming-liang, various incentives for their award-winning films. He presented a NT$10 million (approx. US$323 thousand) prize to Tsai for his film The Wayward Cloud. Tsai in returned said he will soon shoot a new film in Kaohsiung and praised the city's efforts to develop Kaohsiung into an international city.

On July 25, 2005, Kaohsiung officially became the host city of World Games 2009, which will be the largest international sports event hosted in Taiwan, after Chen received the flag of the World Games. Chen later announced the construction of a world-class stadium built for the event.

In August 2005, Thai workers rioted over the draconian treatment they received as foreign workers. These workers lived in poor conditions and had limited freedom. The Chen administration vowed to take action on August 25. Chen apologized to the public for the social turmoil caused by the incident and offered to resign three times. Then-premier Frank Hsieh authorized Chen's resignation on September 12, and replaced him with former vice premier Yeh Chu-lan.

Post-mayoralty 

After a temporary period of research at the London School of Economics in England, Chen was appointed the Deputy Secretary-General of the Presidential Office in February 2007. His appointment drew mixed reactions, with the support from the DPP legislative caucus and opposition from the Kuomintang legislative caucus. Chen served with Lin Chia-lung, former director of the Government Information Office.

After the DPP chairmanship election in May 2008, chairwoman-elect Tsai Ing-wen announced the appointment of Chen as the deputy secretary-general of the party. He held the position with Cho Jung-tai until 2009. Chen is now concurrently serving as both the spokesperson of the Democratic Progressive Party and the chief executive officer of the party's Policy Research and Coordinating Committee since May 2011.

In the 2012 legislative elections, Chen was placed on the DPP electoral list, from which 13 members were elected based on the number of votes the DPP received. Being the eighth member on the list, Chen returned to the Legislative Yuan once again as a legislator in February 2012. He was reelected via proportional representation in 2016. Chen faced fellow lawmakers Chao Tien-lin, Lin Tai-hua, and Kuan Bi-ling in a Kaohsiung mayoral primary held in March 2018, and was named the Democratic Progressive Party candidate for the mayoralty. On November 24, 2018, he was defeated by Han Kuo-yu, the Kuomintang mayoral nominee, by more than 150,000 votes. Chen became the first DPP mayoral candidate to lose in the special municipality of Kaohsiung, established in 2010. His defeat marked the end of 20 years of Democratic Progressive Party governance in the old city area of Kaohsiung, and 33 years of governance in the old Kaohsiung County area.

Chen's resignation from the vice premiership took effect on 19 June 2020, as he then represented the DPP as their candidate contesting in the 2020 Kaohsiung mayoral by-election scheduled for 15 August.

Return to mayoralty

Following the successful recall attempt against Han Kuo-yu, Chen registered as the candidate representing the Democratic Progressive Party in the 2020 Kaohsiung mayoral by-election on 15 August with many calling on him as the favorite to win. He won by a landslide margin with 70 percent of the votes.

Chen succeeded acting mayor  on 24 August.

During Chen's second stint as mayor, President Tsai Ing-wen resigned as chairperson of the Democratic Progressive Party to take responsibility for the party's poor performance in the 2022 local elections. On 30 November 2022, Chen assumed the party leadership in an acting capacity.

Research
Chen has a master's degree in public health from National Taiwan University  and, referring to COVID-19, has been quoted as saying that Taiwan was “the earliest country to activate epidemic prevention measures against this disease”. Chen has proposed using technology including mobile phone data for contact tracing and containment, and is the first author of a paper that describes how passengers of the COVID-19 stricken cruise ship Princess Diamond were traced using mobile phone data, and how their contacts were alerted through text messaging.

Personal
Chen is married to Wu Hong who is also a doctor and has a son and a daughter.

He is a Master Scuba Diver with close to thirty years of experience.

References

External links 

1964 births
Mayors of Kaohsiung
Democratic Progressive Party Members of the Legislative Yuan
Kaohsiung Members of the Legislative Yuan
National Taiwan University alumni
Living people
Politicians of the Republic of China on Taiwan from Keelung
Members of the 3rd Legislative Yuan
Members of the 4th Legislative Yuan
Members of the 5th Legislative Yuan
Members of the 8th Legislative Yuan
Members of the 9th Legislative Yuan
Party List Members of the Legislative Yuan